William Kaplan is a Canadian lawyer and writer.

William Kaplan may also refer to:

William Kaplan (comics)
William B. Kaplan, American sound engineer